Kate Walsh or Katie Walsh may refer to:

Kate Walsh (actress) (born 1967), Italian-American actress
Kate Walsh (politician) (1947–2007), Irish politician
Kate Walsh (businesswoman) (born 1981), businesswoman, contestant on The Apprentice (UK) series 5 and TV presenter
Kate Walsh (singer) (born 1983), British singer
Kate Richardson-Walsh (born 1980), English field hockey player
Kate O'Beirne (Kate Walsh, 1949–2017), right-wing U.S. pundit, commentator and political analyst
Katie Walsh (jockey) (born 1984), Irish jockey
Katie Walsh (politician) (born 1984), American political operative and former White House Deputy Chief of Staff
Kate Walsh (netball) (born 1992), Australian and English netball player

See also
Catherine Walsh (disambiguation)
Kathleen Walsh (disambiguation)